Eduard Stibor was a Czech swimmer. He competed in two events and the water polo at the 1920 Summer Olympics.

References

External links
 

Year of birth missing
Year of death missing
Czech male swimmers
Czechoslovak male water polo players
Olympic swimmers of Czechoslovakia
Olympic water polo players of Czechoslovakia
Swimmers at the 1920 Summer Olympics
Water polo players at the 1920 Summer Olympics
Place of birth missing